Sydney Lorrimar Kirkby,  (born 1933) is an Australian surveyor and Antarctic explorer.

Work
Syd Kirkby was first appointed as Surveyor at Mawson Station for 1956, the third year of ANARE operations in Antarctica.

Syd Kirkby was Surveyor and/or Station Leader of the ANARE 16-month wintering party at Mawson Station for three years: 1956-57, 1960–61, 1980-81. Additionally, he was a member of the summer operations team for four years: 1961-62, 1962–63, 1964–65 and 1979-80.

Kirkby's many accomplishments in Antarctica include establishment of the easternmost, westernmost, and southernmost astrofixes in Australian Antarctic Territory. During his first expedition (1956–57), he was the first man to venture into the Prince Charles Mountains with sled dogs. In the autumn of 1960, he and his team journeyed 400 kilometres through Enderby Land from the Napier Mountains to Mawson station. Between 1961 and 1965, he surveyed more Antarctic territory than any other explorer. His contributions have made a significant impact on the fields of regional geochronology, petrology, tectonics geology, orogeny, glaciology, geomagnetism, and paleomagnetism.

Awards and recognition
Many geographical features in and around Australian Antarctic Territory have been named for Syd Kirkby. Some of these are:
 Mount Kirkby in the Porthos Range of the Prince Charles Mountains
 Kirkby Head on Tange Promontory in Enderby Land, near the Russian Molodezhnaya Station
 Kirkby Shoal in Newcomb Bay, near Casey Station, Shirley Island, Windmill Islands
 Kirkby Glacier on the eastern boundary of Australian Antarctic Territory in the Trans Antarctic Mountains, Oates Land

Other awards and recognition include:
 the Polar Medal (1957)
 Member of the Order of the British Empire (1965)
 the Gold Medal of the Australian Geographic Society as Adventurer of the Year (1997)
 nominated by the newspaper The Australian as one of the ten greatest Australian adventurers of the 20th century (1999)

References

Further reading
 Bowden, Tim (1997). The Silence calling: Australians in Antarctica 1947-97, pp 162–163.

External links
 Australian Antarctic Names and Medals Committee (AANMC)

 United States Geological Survey, Geographic Names Information System (GNIS)
 Scientific Committee on Antarctic Research (SCAR)
 PDF Map of the Australian Antarctic Territory
 Mawson Station

1933 births
Living people
Explorers of Antarctica
Australian Antarctic scientists
Australian scientists
Australian explorers
Officers of the Order of Australia
Australian Members of the Order of the British Empire
Recipients of the Polar Medal